Below are two estimates of the most common words in Modern Spanish. Each estimate comes from an analysis of a different text corpus. A text corpus is a large collection of samples of written and/or spoken language, that has been carefully prepared for linguistic analysis. To determine which words are the most common, researchers create a database of all the words found in the corpus, and categorise them based on the context in which they are used.

The first table lists the 100 most common word forms from the Corpus de Referencia del Español Actual (CREA), a text corpus compiled by the Real Academia Española (RAE). The RAE is Spain's official institution for documenting, planning, and standardising the Spanish language. A word form is any of the grammatical variations of a word.

The second table is a list of 100 most common lemmas found in a text corpus compiled by Mark Davies and other language researchers at Brigham Young University in the United States. A lemma is the primary form of a word—the one that would appear in a dictionary. The Spanish infinitive tener ("to have") is a lemma, while tiene ("has")—which is a conjugation of tener—is a word form.

Real Academia Española
The list below comes from "1000 formas más frecuentes"", a list published by the Real Academia Española (RAE) from analysis of more than 160 million word forms found in the Corpus de Referencia del Español Actual, or CREA. CREA is a computerised corpus of texts written in Spanish, and of transcripts of spoken Spanish. It includes books, magazines, and newspapers with a wide variety of content, as well as transcripts of spoken language from radio and television broadcasts and other sources. All the works in the collection are from 1975 to 2004. CREA includes samples from all Spanish-speaking countries.

The list of "2000 most frequent word forms" comes from an analysis of CREA version 3.2. Plurals, verb conjugations, and other inflections are ranked separately. Homonyms, however, are not distinguished from one another. CREA 3.2 was published in June 2008.

Mark Davies

In 2006, Mark Davies, an associate professor of linguistics at Brigham Young University, published his estimate of the 5000 most common words in Modern Spanish. To make this list, he compiled samples only from 20th-century sources—especially from the years 1970 to 2000. Most of the sources are from the 1990s. Of the 20 million words in the corpus, about one-third (~6,750,000 words) come from transcripts of spoken Spanish: conversations, interviews, lectures, sermons, press conferences, sports broadcasts, and so on. Among the written sources are novels, plays, short stories, letters, essays, newspapers, and the encyclopedia Encarta. The samples, written and spoken, come from Spain and at least 10 Latin American countries. Most of the samples were previously compiled for the Corpus del Español (2001), a 100 million-word corpus that includes works from the 13th century through the 20th.

The 5000 words in Davies' list are lemmas. A lemma is the form of the word as it would appear in a dictionary. Singular nouns and plurals, for example, are treated as the same word, as are infinitives and verb conjugations. The table below includes the top 100 words from Davies' list of 5000. This list distinguishes between the definite articles lo and la and the pronouns lo and la; all are ranked individually. The adjectives ese and esa are ranked together (as are este and esta) ), but the pronoun eso is separate. All conjugations of a verb are ranked together.

A highlighted row indicates that the word was found to occur especially frequently in samples of spoken Spanish.

See also

Notes

References

External links
 

Spanish language
Spanish words and phrases